Labullula is a monotypic genus of African dwarf spiders containing the single species, Labullula annulipes. It was first described by Embrik Strand in 1913, and has only been found in Angola, Cameroon, and Comoros.

See also
 List of Linyphiidae species (I–P)

References

Linyphiidae
Monotypic Araneomorphae genera
Spiders of Africa
Taxa named by Embrik Strand